The Berlin Declaration on Open Access to Knowledge in the Sciences and Humanities is an international statement on open access and access to knowledge.  It emerged from a conference on open access hosted in the Harnack House in Berlin by the Max Planck Society in 2003.

Background
Following the Budapest Open Access Initiative in 2002 and the Bethesda Statement on Open Access Publishing in 2003, the Berlin Declaration was a third influential event in the establishment of the open access movement. Peter Suber has referred to the three events combined as the "BBB definition" of open access as the three overlap with and inform one another.

The declaration was drafted at an October 2003 conference held by the Max Planck Society and the European Cultural Heritage Online (ECHO) project. More than 120 cultural and political organizations from around the world attended.

Statement
The statement itself was published on October 22, 2003. Acknowledging the increasing importance of the internet and the previous discussions on the need for open access, it offered the following definition of an open access contribution:

It also encouraged researchers and institutions to publish their work in accordance with these principles, advocate for open access and help in the development and assessment of open access related tools and measures.

Signatories

, there are 769 signatories of the declaration.

Legacy
At a 2005 follow-up conference, the declaration was refined to two key principles: signatories should require researchers to deposit a copy of their work in an open access repository and encourage the publication of work in open access journals when available. Today these two concepts are often called "Green OA" and "Gold OA, " respectively, and the two combined are referred to as an open-access mandate.

In 2013, on the 10th anniversary of the declaration, a mission statement was published with a goal of ensuring that 90% of research is published within an open access model.

See also
 Open access around the world: 
 Africa: South Africa
 Americas: Canada
 Asia: India
 Europe: Austria, Belgium, Denmark, France, Germany, Greece, Hungary, Ireland, Italy, Netherlands, Norway, Poland, Portugal, Russia, Spain, Sweden, Ukraine
 Plan S — a European open access science publishing initiative launched in late2018

References

External links
 Text of the Declaration (pdf)

Academic publishing
Open access statements
2003 works
Access to Knowledge movement